Gorgeous Mess is the first album by the Pennsylvania rock band Katsu. It was released in the United States in August 2002.

Gorgeous Mess was recorded over a six-month time period from 2001 to 2002 at Saturation Acres Studio in Danville, Pennsylvania.

Track listing
"Brave New World" - 3:09
"Leave Me" - 3:15
"Walkaway" - 4:47
"David & Goliath" - 3:49
"Working Class Blues" - 2:51
"Children" - 3:33
"Anymore" - 3:13
"Bite" - 3:31
"Quest 4 (Woke Up This Morning)" - 3:31
"Jenny" - 3:22
"Wrong" - 4:49
"Everything" - 5:47

Musicians
 Dennis Fallon – acoustic guitar, vocals
 Frank Yarnal – bass guitar
 William Love – guitar
 Eric "Z" Rozzi – drums

References

2002 debut albums
Katsu (band) albums